Livia Brito Pestana (born 21 July 1986) is a Cuban actress and model who gained popularity after making her acting debut in Televisa's telenovela Triunfo del amor. She is also best known for portraying characters that are mostly heroic in all of the telenovelas she starred in.

Biography 
Brito was born on 21 July 1986 in Ciego de Avila, Cuba. The daughter of actor Rolando Brito Rodríguez and Gertrudis Pestana, her family immigrated to Mexico in the year 2000. Brito was between 13 and 14 years of age at the time. A year after settling in Mexico City, her father opened a restaurant called La Cubana, which offered traditional Cuban dishes. Brito worked as a waitress at the family restaurant, and later as a model, to help pay for her studies in Business Administration. She represented Mexico in the 2009 edition of the Reina Mundial del Banano, finishing as first runner-up and awarded Miss Photogenic. She later enrolled in Televisa's Centro de Educación Artística (CEA). Her talents attributed to heredity, coming from an artistic family. Her father was a leading actor in Cuba, while her mother was a major ballet dancer.

Career 
In 2010, she made her debut as Fernanda Sandoval Gutierrez in Triunfo del amor, produced by Salvador Mejía. In 2012, she starred (in a supporting role) as Paloma Gonzalez in Abismo de pasión, produced by Angelli Nesma Medina. She starred in Lucero Suárez's telenovela: De Que Te Quiero, Te Quiero, marking the first time she stars as the protagonist. She then starred as the protagonist once more in Pedro Damian's new telenovela Muchacha italiana viene a casarse alongside Jose Ron. She starred as Maribel Guardia in the Mexican series Por Siempre Joan Sebastian. She starred in the first and second season of La Piloto as Yolanda Cadena, Medicos, linea de vida as Regina Villaseñor, and La desalmada as Fernanda Linares. In 2022, she starred in Mujer de nadie as Lucía Arizmendi.

Filmography

Film

Television

Awards and nominations

Premios TVyNovelas

Premio de la Asociación de Críticos y Periodistas Teatrales (ACPT)

References

External links 
 
 Biography of Livia Brito in dcubanos.com

1986 births
Living people
Mexican telenovela actresses
Mexican television actresses
Mexican film actresses
Mexican stage actresses
Mexican female models
Cuban female models
Actresses from Havana
21st-century Mexican actresses
Cuban emigrants to Mexico
People from Havana